The 2013–14 Kuwait Crown Prince Cup was a cup competition involving teams from the Kuwaiti Premier League. The competition has continued to be played at the beginning of the season but the number of teams entering rounds one and two are fewer compared to the previous season.

First round

Second round

Third round

References

Kuwait Crown Prince Cup
Kuwait Crown Prince Cup
2013–14 in Kuwaiti football